Laocoon, or Laocoön, may refer to:
 Laocoön, the Trojan priest of Poseidon
Laocoon (mythology), mythological characters named Laocoon.
 Laocoön and His Sons, a famous sculpture in Vatican City
 Laocoön (El Greco), an oil painting by El Greco
 : An Essay on the Limits of Painting and Poetry by Gotthold Ephraim Lessing
 Laocoön, William Blake's last illuminated work
 Asteroid 3240 Laocoon